Eurypteryx bhaga, the hook-winged hawkmoth, is a moth of the family Sphingidae first described by Frederic Moore in 1866.

Description
The wingspan is 82–84 mm. It is similar to Daphnis species, but easily distinguished by the falcate apex of the forewing, which also lacks a large oval dark green basal patch on the upperside. It is also similar to Eurypteryx obtruncata, but the forewing outer margin is less curved and the hindwing apex is evenly rounded. There is an incomplete line on the forewing upperside running from the costa towards the middle of the outer margin, dividing the light brown apical area from the deep brown discal area. The antemedian band has a pale basal edge. The hindwing upperside is almost uniformly dark brown with a lighter patch at the tornus. The forewing underside has two distinct median lines.

Gallery

Distribution
It is known from Nepal, north-eastern India, from south-western to central China, Thailand, Malaysia (Peninsular, Sarawak) and Indonesia (Sumatra, Java, Kalimantan).

Biology
The larvae feed on Alstonia species.

References

Eurypteryx
Moths described in 1866